Shadow.tech is a Cloud computing service developed by the French company Blade that was acquired by OVHcloud founder Octave Klaba in 2021. Its technology is based on Windows 10 servers executing video games or other Windows software applications remotely. Unlike many other cloud services such as Nvidia GeForce Now, or Amazon Luna, Shadow is not limited to running video games, as Shadow.tech provides remote access to a complete PC infrastructure.

History 
In 2015, Emmanuel Freund, Stéphane Héliot and Asher Kagan-Criou created a start-up called Blade to propose a cloud-gaming service called Shadow. 

At the start of 2016, they raised 3 million euros of capital, then 10 million, followed in 2017 by 51 million, with several investors.

In 2019, Blade further raised 30 million euros, following the arrival of Google in the Cloud gaming sector with Stadia. 

In October 2019, Shadow had more than 70000 users. In November 2020, They announced having more than 100000 active users.

In September 2020, Blade CEO et CTO change for Mike Fischer and Jean-Baptiste Kempf (one of the major contributors of the VLC media player project).

In March 2021, it was announced that Blade had filed for Chapter 11 Protection in the United States, as well as filing for bankruptcy in Europe.

In May 2021, it was announced that Blade had been bought after its insolvency by Octave Klaba, CEO of OVHcloud. Before he bought the service however, Octave Klaba announced that he was not interested in Cloud Gaming but intended to develop a European alternative to Office 365.

On May 24, 2021, Shadow's new management announced major restructuring to the previous pricing structure, removing the Ultra and Infinite tier plans, and leaving the $30 USD Boost plan as the company's sole offering (until the upcoming hardware upgrades and new plans announced in May 2022 are rolled out.)

In March 2021, the Shadow team announced a Dual Screen feature. In August 2021, Octave Klaba, OVHcloud CEO, informed that service subscription approval was renewed after a pause which lasted starting from the bankruptcy announcements. In October of that year, Shadow also announced a new logo and brand that would begin usage in 2022.

In May 2022, upcoming hardware upgrades and expansions to Shadow's services were announced by the company.

References

External links
 

Cloud gaming
French companies established in 2015